Tampa Bay Water (TBW) is a regional wholesale drinking water utility that serves customers in the Tampa Bay, Florida region. The agency is a special district of the state created by inter-local agreement among six member governments. A nine-member board of directors composed of two elected commissioners from each member county and one elected representative from each member city oversees the policy decisions of the agency. The member governments that make up the board of directors are: The cities of New Port Richey, St. Petersburg, Florida, and Tampa, and Hillsborough County, Pasco County, and Pinellas County.  These member governments provide water to over 2.5 million citizens.

Tampa Bay Water, formerly the West Coast Regional Water Supply Authority, was created in 1998 to deliver drinking water in an environmentally sound, cost-effective and reliable manner. To achieve these goals, the Agency created a diversified water supply system to reduce dependence on a sole source—groundwater.

The region's water sources are:

 Surface water from the Alafia River, Hillsborough River and Tampa Bypass Canal
 Reverse osmosis desalinated seawater from Tampa Bay
 Groundwater from regional well fields

Board of directors
 Chairman: Sandra Murman, Hillsborough County Commissioner
 Vice Chairman: Dave Eggers, Pinellas County Commissioner
 Pat Gerard, Pinellas County Commissioner
 Pat Kemp, Hillsborough County Commissioner
 Rob Marlowe, Mayor, New Port Richey
 Charlie Miranda, Tampa Councilman
 Ron Oakley, Pasco County Commissioner
 Darden Rice, St. Petersburg Councilwoman
 Kathryn Starkey, Pasco County Commissioner

References

External links
 

Government agencies established in 1998
1988 establishments in Florida
Special districts of Florida
Water companies of the United States
Tampa Bay area